Chad Collins (born 1978) is an American professional golfer.

Chad Collins may also refer to:

 Chad Michael Collins (born 1979), American actor
 Chad Collins (politician), Canadian politician
 Chadd Collins (born 1995), Australian Muay Thai fighter